Jesse McDonald, better known by their stage name Jesse Dangerously, or The Halifax Rap Legend, is an alternative hip hop artist from Halifax, Nova Scotia and operating out of Ottawa, Ontario. Dangerously has released solo projects, provided guest vocals for other local artists, hosted a weekly radio show, written a weekly column, and produced beats for other musicians. They are a member of the Backburner crew.

Career
Dangerously is a fan of 1988 to 1994-era hip hop, and claims a wide range of influences and favourites, including such artists as Public Enemy, Das EFX, early LL Cool J, early Masta Ace, Black Sheep, Gang Starr, Casual, Breeze Brewin, Aesop Rock, Psalm One, Saafir, Jadakiss, Knowself, Bonshah, and the Fresh Prince, among others.

Kicking off their career in the late 1990s with the album B.R.E.A.K., Dangerously has since released five solo projects, as well as a group album with their Backburner crewmate Ambition under the name The Library Steps. Dangerously’s most recent solo album is Humble & Brilliant (2011), but they released two separate collaboration albums with producers in 2018: The Library Steps’ Rap Dad, Real Dad (a Gang Starr or Pete Rock & CL Smooth-style rapper/producer duo album, the other half of The Library Steps being Dangerously’s Backburner crewmate Ambition), and Want, For Nothing, a duo album with producer Liz Grove under the crew name DangerGrove. Both albums sold modestly but were successes among critics and were well-received by Dangerously’s small cult following.

Rapper mc chris has referred to Dangerously as a nerdcore hip hop artist, saying the following:

"The truth is I'm kicking every other rapper like me's ass up and down the boardwalk. I only like one and will say his name quite happily. Jesse Dangerously. He's good. The rest suck. That’s hard to say and i haven't said it before because some of these people are my fans, some are my friends."

Dangerously has provided guest vocals on MC Frontalot's albums Nerdcore Rising and Final Boss, performed at the Halifax Pop Explosion, and was a top-6 finalist in a Napster-sponsored writing/rapping competition judged by Chuck D in 1999. They appeared on the MuchMusic program Going Coastal on March 19, 2006, was used by MTV Canada's MTV Live as a rapping correspondent to describe the history of nerdcore, and has been featured on the CBC Radio program Atlantic Airwaves, as well as on many programmes on CBC Radio 3.

From June 2004 until May 2007, Dangerously hosted The Pavement, a weekly hip hop show on CKDU 88.1 FM that was handed down to them from Buck 65 and Skratch Bastid. They have guest lectured at Saint Mary's University on the topic of gender issues in rap music and popular culture, and from January 2006 until October 2007, they penned a weekly column on regional hip-hop for The Daily News of Halifax.

Dangerously’s fifth solo album, Humble & Brilliant, was released to the Internet as a chapbook and download on March 10, 2011. It is their most recent solo album, and was their most recent release overall until the two collaborative albums arrived in 2018.

Personal life
Dangerously identifies as non-binary, and uses both they/them and he/him pronouns.

Discography

Solo
B.R.E.A.K. (1996)
Eastern Canadian World Tour 2002 (2002)
How to Express Your Dissenting Political Viewpoint Through Origami (2004)
Inter Alia (2005)
Verba Volant (2007)
Humble & Brilliant (2011)

Collaborations
The Sentinels - The Lying City, EP (1998)
Imaginary Friends  - The ImF Ride b/w Even Exist (As In, "We Don't..."), 7" (2004)
The Mighty Rhino  - "Basically Jesus" (also featuring More Or Les, I Am Joseph & Cam James), from We Will No Longer Retreat Into Darkness (2018)
The Library Steps - Rap Dad, Real Dad, LP (2018) (Collaboration with Ambition)
Danger Grove - Want, For Nothing, LP (2018) (Collaboration with Lizard Grove)

References

External links
 Jesse Dangerously's site
 Jesse Dangerously's Blog
 Halifax Daily News column
 Electronic Press Kit
 Nerdcore Compilation CD Project

Musicians from Halifax, Nova Scotia
Non-binary musicians
Nerdcore artists
20th-century Canadian rappers
Living people
1979 births
21st-century Canadian rappers